Mimocrossotus is a genus of longhorn beetles of the subfamily Lamiinae.

 Mimocrossotus rhodesianus Breuning, 1972
 Mimocrossotus ugandicola Breuning, 1964

References

Crossotini